William Richmond or variants may refer to:
 William Richmond (politician) (1821–1895), New Zealand politician
 William Blake Richmond (1842–1921), English painter and decorator
 William Henry Richmond (1821–1922), American coal mine operator
 William Richmond (biochemist) (1941–2010), British biochemist and medical researcher
 William Richmond (cricketer) (1843–1912), English cricketer for Lancashire
 Will Richmond (born 2000), American soccer player
 Bill Richmond (1763–1829), British boxer
 Bill Richmond (writer) (1921–2016), American film and television comedy writer and producer
 Bill Richmond (director) (born 1958), television producer, director and editor